Qohurd-e Sofla (also Romanized as Qohūrd-e Soflá; also known as Ghohordé Sofla, Khokhurd Pāin, Kūkhūrd Pāīn, Qohord, Qohord-e Pā’īn, and Qohord-e Soflá) is a village in Mehraban-e Sofla Rural District, Gol Tappeh District, Kabudarahang County, Hamadan Province, Iran. At the 2006 census, its population was 682, in 155 families.

References 

Populated places in Kabudarahang County